Samasata Junction railway station (Urdu and ) is located in Samasata town, Bahawalpur district of Punjab province, Pakistan. The station served as the junction between the Karachi–Peshawar Railway Line and the now defunct Samasata–Amruka Branch Line (and onwards to the Bahawalnagar–Fort Abbas Branch Line).

See also
 List of railway stations in Pakistan
 Pakistan Railways

References

External links

Railway stations in Bahawalpur District
Railway stations on Samasata–Amruka Branch Line
Railway stations on Karachi–Peshawar Line (ML 1)